A take and bake pizzeria, sometimes just known as a take and bake (or alternatively, take-n-bake), is a pizzeria which sells uncooked pizzas to customers, who then cook the pizzas at home in their own ovens.

Take-and-bake pizzas are typically made to order out of fresh ingredients (though the pizzeria may also keep a number of commonly ordered or special sale price pizzas on hand for convenience). Often because the pizzas are made with fresh and unbaked ingredients and not heated in-store, the pizzas can be paid for in some states with food assistance EBT cards.

According to Nation's Restaurant News, take-and-bake pizzerias typically have lower costs because they require less restaurant space and equipment. As a result, they are often able to undercut the national pizza giants.

Many take-and-bake pizzerias either operate as standalone entities, or as part of delicatessens. Such establishments often offer other menu items, such as cookie dough, soft drinks, salads, breadsticks, or dessert items, in addition to pizza. Some supermarkets also offer this feature, including Sobeys and Safeway (where a delicatessen is attached to a pizza section). In addition, some traditional dine-in pizzerias, such as Pizzeria Uno, also provide take-and-bake pizzas at some locations.

The leading specialty chains offering take and bake pizza in America are Papa Murphy's, Figaro's, and Nick-N-Willy's. Several grocery and retail chains, such as Kroger and Wal-Mart, also offer take and bake pizza.

References

Take and bake pizzerias
Convenience foods